The 1988 East Carolina Pirates football team was an American football team that represented East Carolina University as an independent during the 1988 NCAA Division I-A football season. In their fourth and final season under head coach Art Baker, the team compiled a 3–8 record.

Schedule

References

East Carolina
East Carolina Pirates football seasons
East Carolina Pirates football